Chang Eun-kyung (26 May 1951 – 3 December 1979) was a Korean judoka and silver medalist who competed in the 1976 Summer Olympics.

References

External links 
 
 

1951 births
1979 deaths
South Korean male judoka
South Korean academics
Olympic judoka of South Korea
Olympic silver medalists for South Korea
Olympic medalists in judo
Judoka at the 1976 Summer Olympics
Medalists at the 1976 Summer Olympics
Yong In University alumni
Sportspeople from Gyeonggi Province
20th-century South Korean people